American singer-songwriter Margo Price has released four studio albums, two live albums, one extended play (EP), ten singles, and seven music videos.

Albums

Studio albums

Live albums

Extended plays

Singles

Music videos

With Buffalo Clover
Pick Your Poison (2010)
Low Down Time (2011)
Test Your Love (2013)

References

Margo Price albums
Discographies of American artists